Harley Street is a street in Marylebone, Central London, which has, since the 19th century housed a large number of private specialists in medicine and surgery. It was named after Edward Harley, 2nd Earl of Oxford and Earl Mortimer.

Overview
Since the 19th century, the number of doctors, hospitals, and medical organisations in and around Harley Street has greatly increased. Records show that there were around 20 doctors in 1860, 80 by 1900, and almost 200 by 1914. When the National Health Service was established in 1948, there were around 1,500. Today, there are more than 3,000 people employed in the Harley Street area, in clinics, medical and paramedical practices, and hospitals such as Dr. Gabriela Clinic, The Harley Street Clinic, Hifu Skin Clinic,  Medical Express Clinic, Harley Medical Foot and Nail Clinic, Harley Street Fertility Clinic, Sonoworld Diagnostic Services, London Women's Centre  The London Women's Clinic, The London Clinic, Harley Street Life Coaching,The Dermatology Clinic London, The London Scar Clinic 152 Harley Street Day Clinic Neo Health Clinic, 

The nearest London Underground stations are Regent's Park, Great Portland Street and Oxford Circus.

Land ownership
Harley Street is part of the Howard de Walden Estate.

Notable occupants
Many famous people have lived or practised in Harley Street, including the Victorian Prime Minister William Ewart Gladstone, the artist J. M. W. Turner, and the speech therapist Lionel Logue. Queen's College, founded in 1848 and one of the oldest girls' schools in England, is situated on Harley Street.

Sir William Beechey (Portrait painter) lived at No.13.
George Frederick Bodley (Greek Revival Architect) lived at No.109 from 1862 to 1873. Blue Plaque.
Wilkie Collins, author of The Woman and White and The Moonstone, lived at No. 12 (later renumbered No. 26) with Caroline Graves from 1860 to 1864.
Sir Grantly Dick-Read (Obstetrician) lived and had his practice at No.23. Green Plaque.
Sir Stewart Duke-Elder (Ophthalmologist) lived & worked at No.63. Blue Plaque.
Sir James Galloway (1862-1922), dermatologist, practised at No. 54
Harriet Harman MP KC, Labour politician, born at 108 Harley Street.
William Henry Giles Kingston, Victorian author of boys' adventure novels, was born on Harley Street, 28 February 1814.
Lionel Logue (Speech therapist), from Australia, had his practice at No.146. He helped King George VI overcome his stammer with lessons here. There is a Green Plaque.
Sir Charles Lyell (lawyer, author and geologist). Lived at  No.11 (which is now No.73).
 Sir Morell Mackenzie, the 'Father of British Laryngology' lived in 19, Harley Street till his death. Involved in the great controversy while treating the German Crown Prince Fredrick III, the Son-in-law of Her Majesty Queen Victoria for his laryngeal disease, allegedly cancer of the left vocal cord which led to the demise of the Emperor in 1888.
Stafford Northcote, 1st Earl of Iddesleigh (British Politician, Conservative Chancellor of the Exchequer) lived at No.86.
Allan Ramsay (Portrait painter) lived at No.67.
Sir Harold Ridley (Pioneering Ophthalmologist). Lived at No.53.
John St. John Long, a famous quack, practised in Harley Street from 1827 to 1834.
J. M. W. Turner (Landscape painter) lived at No.64 from 1799 to 1805.
Sir Arthur Wellesley, the future Duke of Wellington , had his first London residence in Harley Street.
Charles Wilson, 1st Baron Moran, who was Winston Churchill's personal physician, had a private practice at No. 29 during the 1920s and 1930s.
Isabel Thorne member of the Edinburgh Seven lived at 148, Harley Street, London.
Mary Scharlieb, Dame and pioneer woman doctor had a medical practice and lived at 149 Harley Street, London.

Fictional references

In Virginia Woolf's Mrs. Dalloway (1925), medical professional Sir William Bradshaw lives on Harley Street.

In Jane Austen's Sense and Sensibility (1813), the Dashwood sisters, Lucy Steele, Mrs Jennings, Edward Ferrars, and others spend some of their free time there while in London.

P.G. Wodehouse's Sir Roderick Glossop, the “nerve specialist", was said to maintain a practice on Harley Street.

Dr. Janet of Harley Street is a novel about a woman doctor  published in 1894 by Dr. Arabella Kenealy.

In Agatha Christie’s The Secret of Chimneys (1925), Lord Caterham ruefully mentions that his doctor advised him to “avoid all worry. So easy for a man sitting in his consulting room in Harley Street to say that.” Earlier in the book, a surgeon in Harley Street is mentioned among names listed in a phone book. Agatha Christie's Death in the Clouds (1935), and And Then There Were None (1938) include characters who are a Harley Street physicians. In Agatha Christie's Crooked House (1949), Edith de Haviland visits Harley Street.

In Henry James' "The Turn of the Screw" (1898), the wealthy uncle at the beginning of the work apparently has a house on Harley Street.

In the movie The Revenge of Frankenstein, Dr Victor Frankenstein aka Dr Franck after his brain transplant begins his medical practice on Harley Street W

In John Banville's The Untouchable, Victor Maskell visits his doctor and is told "I should have thought you had died already, in a way." ... which is "not the kind of thing you expect to hear from a Harley Street consultant, is it."

In Richard Osman's The Bullet That Missed (2022), Now the door opens, and Fiona Clemence pops her head around it. That auburn hair, so famous from the shampoo adverts, the full smile, so famous from the toothpaste adverts, and the cheekbones honed by genetics and Harley Street.

See also
 List of eponymous roads in London
 Macquarie Street, Sydney
 Rodney Street, the Harley Street of the North, in Liverpool
 Welbeck Street
 Wimpole Street
 Weymouth Street Hospital

References

External links

 George Harley, 

 
Health in the City of Westminster
History of medicine in the United Kingdom
Medical districts
Howard de Walden Estate
Areas of London
City of Westminster
Streets in London